The following is a list of Loyola Marymount Lions men's basketball head coaches. There have been 27 head coaches of the Lions in their 100-season history.

Loyola Marymount's current head coach is Stan Johnson. He was hired as the Lions' head coach in March 2020, replacing Mike Dunlap, who was fired after the 2019–20 season.

References

Loyola Marymount

Loyola Marymount Lions basketball, men's, coaches